Siniloan, officially the Municipality of Siniloan,  is a 2nd class municipality in the province of Laguna, Philippines. According to the 2020 census, it has a population of 39,460 people.

Sinilóan is a center of education, commerce and transportation, serving towns in eastern Laguna and some towns from the provinces of Quezon and Rizal. The municipality has active business and trade activities.

Etymology
From the early period of Spanish colonialisation, some female inhabitants of the place were milling their palay in their fields. While doing this, some Spaniards came and asked them, "Como se llama esta pueblo?" The natives, not knowing Spanish thought that they were asked what they were doing and one of them answered, "camí po ay gumiguiling". The Spaniards repeated, "Guiling-Guiling", to which the natives nodded. Some this place known as "Guiling-Guiling" from 1583 to 1604.

Another story has it that during the later part of the year 1604, three brothers, namely, Juan Puno, Juan Pili, and Juan Puhuwan, migrated into this community. They selected a lot adjacent to the river Río Romelo and divided it equally among themselves. When the parish priest saw the ingenuity of the three brothers in equally dividing the land, he asked the natives how equally was expressed in Tagalog. The natives gave him the expression "Sinloan". Right then and there, the name Guiling-Guiling was changed to Siniloang which meant justice, equality and fairness. The word travelled from mouth to mouth with sound variations. Because of the difficulty of some Spaniards in pronouncing Siniloang, the name Siniloan struck and became the official name of this town.

The name Siniloan is also believed to have been taken from a legendary story about Luis and Ana, a married couple who chased a wild boar from a place called Luisiana. They ran after that big boar from Luisiana to Cavinti (kapit sa Binti). The people along the way who saw Luis and Ana chasing the boar took pity on them and helped them to catch it. The people chased the boar through the towns of Lumbán, Kalayaan, Loñgos, Paéte, Paquil, and Pañguil until they finally caught the boar in this town by means of the lassoed captivity or Siniloan. Siniloan start on 3 eggs.

History
In 1583, Sinilóan came to be as a town. This was the year when Don Juan de Salcedo came to this place and the parish was established jointly by Friar Diégo de Orpesa and Friar Juan de Plasencia. The first stone church was erected in 1733 by a Franciscan Friar. , Fr. Melchor de San Antonio.

Famy which was formerly a small barrio of Sinilóan and known as Barrio Calumpáng was separated from Sinilóan in 1910, while the towns of Santa Maria (formerly Caboan) and Mabitac, also former visitas or barrios of Sinilóan, were separated from the town in 1602 and 1613, respectively.

Geography
Sinilóan lies between the plains of the Sierra Madre Mountains and Laguna de Bay, bounded between the municipality of Mabitac on the west, Pañguil on the east, Real, Quezon on the North and Laguna de Bay on the South. A river named Río Romelo runs through the center of the town and is used for fishing ground and irrigation purposes.

Barangays
Sinilóan is politically subdivided into 20 barangays. Of these, 13 are classified as urban and 7 are classified as rural.

Acevida
Bagong Pag-Asa (Poblacion)
Bagumbarangay (Poblacion)
Buhay
Gen. Luna
Halayhayin
Mendiola
Kapatalan
Laguio
Liyang
Llavac
Pandeño
Magsaysay
Macatad
Mayatba
P. Burgos
G. Redor (Poblacion)
Salubungan
Wawa
J. Rizal (Poblacion)

Climate

Demographics

Religion
Religion in Sinilóan are major in Roman Catholicism, about 90% of the population, 7% of Protestantism and other Christian religions and 3% Muslim. The patron saint of this town are Saint Peter and Saint Paul (San Pedro y San Pablo) also the Black Nazarene (Nazareno Negro o Cristo Negro) The town feast is celebrated every 29 June each year.

Economy

Tourism

Saints Peter and Paul Parish Church also Parroquía de San Pablo y San Pedro is the first and only Roman Catholic church in Sinilóan since 1604. Built it as stone church from 1733 to 1739 by Fr. Melchor de San Antonio, but destroyed during the 18 July 1880 earthquake. Rebuilt in 1890 to 1898 and was again damaged during the August 20, 1937 earthquake. Today's church colloquially called Laguna Cathedral (unofficial) was reconstructed, modernized and remodel as twice the size of the previous church for its quadricentennial anniversary on 2004 under the supervision of Monsignor Mario Rafael M. Castillo, P.C. E.V. as the parish priest or 'cura parroco'.
Holy Cross Orthodox Church: a fledgling Orthodox Christian community under the spiritual jurisdiction of the Orthodox Metropolitanate of Hong Kong and South East Asia,established by His All-Holiness Bartholomew I, Archbishop of Constantinople and Ecumenical Patriarch, known as the "Green Patriarch." The parish priest Archimandrite Philemon Castro (M.Div.) serves the 4th century Byzantine Liturgy of St. John Chrysostom every 2nd &4th Sunday monthly at 9:00-12:00 in the morning, followed by Agape for members and fellowship with guests and visitors. Patronal Feasts Exaltation of the Holy Cross (Sept. 14th), Sts. Peter and Paul (June 29), Sts. Constantine and Helene (May 21). Located at #84 Valderrama St., Barangay Bagong Pag-Asa.
Buruwisan Falls *Getting to Mt Romelo and Buruwisan Falls
Buruwisan falls is located in Siniloan Laguna which is around eighty kilometers east of Manila. To get there we had to cross the long winding roads of Teresa and Bugarin to Mabitac.
By public transport 
Take UV express vans bound to Tanay market in Starmall-Shaw terminal (P70). Then in Tanay market, ride a jeepney going to Siniloan (P47).  In Siniloan, take a tricycle to Brgy Macatad (Mt Romelo's jumpoff) (P20).
By private transport
From Manila, Take the east-bound lane of Ortigas Avenue going to Antipolo. Then take the Manila-east route going to Famy, Laguna. From here jump off is less than 10 minutes away via Siniloan-Famy-Real-Infanta Road.
Major Jump-off: Barangay Macatad, �Elevation: 300 MASL�Days required / hours to summit: 1 day, 2–3 hours�Specs: Minor Climb, Difficulty 2/9, Trail Class 1�Features: Waterfalls, rain forest

Education
Schools:
Colegio Santa Isabel of Laguna
Laguna State Polytechnic University
Siniloan Integrated National High School
Bridgewater School
Siniloan Elementary School
Angela Ong Javier Elementary School
Halayhayin Elementary School
Solid Foundation Christian Academy
Kapatalan Elementary School
Kapatalan National High School
Antonio Adricula Memorial Elementary School
Buhay Elementary School
(Laguna Northwestern College)LNC-San Lorenzo Ruiz Montessori Center
Bernbelle Pre-School Learning Center
Camelean Academy

Healthcare
Siniloan Pioneer General Hospital
This is the first hospital to be established in the town of Siniloan, Laguna Philippines.  Established in 2010, this 22 bed community hospital is accredited as a level one hospital by the Department of health and is Philhealth accredited.

Utility Services
Siniloan Water District (SIWADI)

References

External links

 [ Philippine Standard Geographic Code]
 Philippine Census Information
 Local Governance Performance Management System

Municipalities of Laguna (province)
Populated places on Laguna de Bay